Ponte Preta is a municipality in the state of Rio Grande do Sul, Brazil. In 2020 it had an estimated population of 1,524.

References

Municipalities in Rio Grande do Sul